NGC 2841 is an unbarred spiral galaxy in the northern circumpolar constellation of Ursa Major. It was discovered on 9 March 1788 by German-born astronomer William Herschel. J. L. E. Dreyer, the author of the New General Catalogue, described it as, "very bright, large, very much extended 151°, very suddenly much brighter middle equal to 10th magnitude star". Initially thought to be about 30 million light-years distant, a 2001 Hubble Space Telescope survey of the galaxy's Cepheid variables determined its distance to be approximately 14.1 megaparsecs or 46 million light-years.

This is the prototype for the flocculent spiral galaxy, a type of spiral galaxy whose arms are patchy and discontinuous. The morphological class is SAa, indicating a spiral galaxy with no central bar and very tightly-wound arms. There is no grand design structure visible in the optical band, although some inner spiral arms can be seen in the near infrared. It is inclined by an angle of 68° to the line of sight from the Earth, with the major axis aligned along a position angle of 148°.

The properties of NGC 2841 are similar to those of the Andromeda Galaxy. It is home to a large population of young blue stars, and a few H II regions.

The rotational behavior of the galaxy suggests there is a massive nuclear bulge, with a low-ionization nuclear emission-line region (LINER) at the core; a type of region that is characterized by spectral line emission from weakly ionized atoms. The nucleus appears decoupled and there is a counter-rotating element of stars and gas in the outer parts of the nucleus, suggesting a recent interaction with a smaller galaxy.

References

External links 

Unbarred spiral galaxies
Flocculent spiral galaxies
LINER galaxies
Ursa Major (constellation)
2841
04966
026512
Astronomical objects discovered in 1788